Shane Edwards (born May 31, 1987) is an American professional basketball player for the Kawasaki Brave Thunders of the B.League. He played college basketball for Northeastern JC and Little Rock.

College career
Edwards attended Mountain Pointe High School in Phoenix, Arizona, where he starred at basketball. Following his graduation he played junior college basketball at the Northeastern Junior College before moving to University of Arkansas at Little Rock, where he graduated in 2009.

Professional career

2009–10 season
Edwards went undrafted in the 2009 NBA draft. On November 1, 2009, he was acquired by the Albuquerque Thunderbirds. On November 26, 2009, he was waived by the Thunderbirds. On December 16, 2009, he was re-acquired by the Thunderbirds.

2010–11 season
In July 2010, Edwards joined the Denver Nuggets for the 2010 NBA Summer League. On September 24, 2010, he signed with the Nuggets. However, he was later waived by the Nuggets on October 11, 2010.

On October 31, 2010, he was acquired by the New Mexico Thunderbirds. On February 3, 2011, he was named to the West All-Star roster for the 2011 NBA D-League All-Star Game.

2011–12 season
In July 2011, Edwards signed with Tezenis Verona of the Italian Legadue Basket for the 2011–12 season. In December 2011, he left Verona after just nine games. On March 6, 2012, he was acquired by the Canton Charge. On April 2, 2012, he was waived by the Charge due to injury.

2012–13 season
On August 26, 2012, Edwards signed with Cairns Taipans for the 2012–13 NBL season.

2013–14 season
In November 2013, Edwards was re-acquired by the Canton Charge. On March 12, 2014, he signed a 10-day contract with the Cleveland Cavaliers. On March 21, 2014, he was released by the Cavaliers, and was immediately re-acquired by the Charge.

2014–15 season
In July 2014, Edwards joined the Cleveland Cavaliers for the 2014 NBA Summer League. On September 28, 2014, he signed with Cavaliers. However, he was later waived by the Cavaliers on October 25, 2014.

On November 20, 2014, he signed with Sundsvall Dragons of Sweden for the rest of the 2014–15 season.

2015–16 season
On August 21, 2015, Edwards signed a one-year deal with BG Göttingen of the Basketball Bundesliga. On January 11, 2016, he parted ways with Göttingen after averaging 11.7 points per game.

On February 20, 2016, he signed with the Alaska Aces of the Philippine Basketball Association as a temporary replacement import for the injured Robert Dozier.

2016–17 season
On March 15, 2017, Edwards was acquired by the Delaware 87ers of the NBA Development League. After a short stint, he was released and acquired by the Nauticos de Mazatlán of the Mexican CIBACOPA.

2017–18 season
In January 2018, Edwards signed with the CLS Knights Indonesia of the ASEAN Basketball League.

In March 2018, he signed with the Barangay Ginebra San Miguel of the Philippine Basketball Association as a temporary import for the 2018 PBA Commissioner's Cup. However, he was released in April 2018 before appearing in a regular season game.

NBA career statistics

Regular season

|-
| style="text-align:left;"| 
| style="text-align:left;"| Cleveland
| 2 || 0 || 6.0 || .333 || .000 || .000 || 1.0 || .0 || .0 || .0 || 1.0
|- class="sortbottom"
| style="text-align:left;"| Career
| style="text-align:left;"|
| 2 || 0 || 6.0 || .333 || .000 || .000 || 1.0 || .0 || .0 || .0 || 1.0

References

External links
Profile at Eurobasket.com
Arkansas-Little Rock profile
RealGM.com profile

1987 births
Living people
Alaska Aces (PBA) players
Albuquerque Thunderbirds players
American expatriate basketball people in Australia
American expatriate basketball people in Germany
American expatriate basketball people in Italy
American expatriate basketball people in Japan
American expatriate basketball people in Mexico
American expatriate basketball people in the Philippines
American expatriate basketball people in Sweden
American expatriate basketball people in Indonesia
American men's basketball players
ASEAN Basketball League players
Basketball players from Phoenix, Arizona
BG Göttingen players
Canton Charge players
Cleveland Cavaliers players
Delaware 87ers players
Junior college men's basketball players in the United States
Kawasaki Brave Thunders players
Little Rock Trojans men's basketball players
New Mexico Thunderbirds players
Philippine Basketball Association imports
Scaligera Basket Verona players
Small forwards
Sundsvall Dragons players
Undrafted National Basketball Association players
Venados de Mazatlán (basketball) players